Choro 2021 is a mobile video game released for Android and iOS on 5 December 2021. The game follows a cowboy in a dystopian Venezuela that has to fight malandros, soldiers, zombies and witches, while finding references of the country, such as an empanada, a Toronto or a Riko Malt. In the first released level, the protagonist has to cross Mission Zamora and fight the witch Bruja Maruja. It was developed by Venezuelan filmmaker Carl Zitelmann and based in an homonymous novel, Choro 2021 is an action and adventure metroidvania, with a design similar to Contra, Mega Man, Castlevania and Ninja Gaiden.

References

External links 
 
 

2021 video games
Android (operating system) games
Dystopian video games
Indie video games
IOS games
Metroidvania games
Video games based on novels
Video games developed in Venezuela
Video games set in 2021
Video games set in Venezuela
Western (genre) video games